Manoba lativittata is a moth in the  family Nolidae. It was described by Frederic Moore in 1888. It is found in Sikkim state of India and in Thailand.

References

Moths described in 1888
Nolinae